Heebo may be:
an old spelling of Igbo
the name of a variant of the Roboto typeface

See also 
 Hebo (disambiguation)